The Argel (in its upper course also: Rădvanu) is a right tributary of the river Moldovița in Romania. It flows into the Moldovița in the village Argel.

References

Rivers of Romania
Rivers of Suceava County